José Acevedo may refer to:
 José Acevedo y Gómez (1773–1817), Colombian hero
 José Acevedo (baseball) (born 1977), Dominican Republic baseball pitcher
 José Acevedo (footballer) (born 1985), Chilean footballer
 José Acevedo (sprinter) (born 1986), Venezuelan sprinter